Gédéon Geismar (1863-1931) was a French-Jewish brigadier general and Zionist. He was the first president of the Jewish National Fund and a president of the Eclaireurs Israélites de France. He was the uncle of French politicians Léon Geismar and Max Hymans.

Life

Early life 
Gédéon Geismar was born in Dambach-la-Ville on 10 January 1864 in the German Empire to Marx Geismar and Jeanne Léopold. He studied in Dambach-la-Ville's small Jewish school, where he learned German and Hebrew.

In 1874, his father sent him to a boarding school in Belfort in order "to be French". He studied there until 1882.

Geismar graduated from Paris' École Polytechnique on 1 November 1883. Upon his graduation, he decided to pursue a military career, deciding to work with artillery.

Military career 
On 1 October 1885 he entered as a second-lieutenant at the School of Artillery and Engineering Application in Versailles.

In 1894, Geismar became captain in the Second Foot Artillery Battalion. He was made a squadron leader in 1905 for the 40th artillery regiment.

Assigned to the staff of the Third Artillery Corps in Rouen on 1907, he progressed upwards to the position of lieutenant-colonel, becoming the leader of the corps.

World War One 
Geismar served for the French Army during the First World War, and in 1915, led the 44th Artillery Regiment against the Germans. In May of that year he was appointed colonel. He is said to have participated in the Battle of Charleroi.

In 1918,he led the 21st Army Corps' artillery regiment in Strasbourg. On February 7 of that year, he received the rank of brigadier general, the highest he would ever achieve in the army.

Zionist activism 
When Geismar finally retired in January 1923, he became increasingly active in the Zionist movement, assisting the development of Keren Hayesod (Reconstruction Fund), with André Spire. He then became honorary president of the K.K.l (Keren Kayemeth Leisrael or Jewish National Fund)'s Central Commission. His knowledge of Hebrew made him able to read Mandatory Palestine's press. His fellow members included Édouard Herriot, Paul Painlevé, Jules Cambon, Aristide Briand, Raymond Poincaré, Alexandre Barthou, and Gaston Doumergue. The society's Secretary-General was Henri Hertz. In 1927, he was elected to the executive committee of the de la Zionist Federation of France. He helped found the Franco-Palestinian Centre of Commerce. In 1928, he accepted the presidency of the Éclaireuses et éclaireurs israélites de France (EEIF), saying he was "training the young recruits of the Jewish people."

Death 
Gédéon Geismar died on 28 June 1931 in the 14th arrondissement of Paris. He is buried in

Personal life 
Geismar, who was raised in a devout family, was deeply religious, and refused to garrison in cities without synagogues.

Family and ancestry 
Geismar's father, Marx (-1898) was born in Grussenheim, Haut-Rhin. His mother Jeanne Léopold was from Pfaffenhoffen, and died in Paris.

He married Parisian-born Marthe Léa Lévy on October 16, 1903. They had two children : Yvonne Geismar, a lawyer and the 15th deputy mayor of Paris, and Jean Gabriel, a business magnate.

He had two notable nephews :  Léon Geismar, governor of French West Africa, and Max Hymans, CEO of Air France.

Works 

 Instruction for the observation service in the German foot artillery. translated by G. Geismar, published in 1891.
 Instructions for the direction of fire in the German foot artillery published 1892.
 Organization of Objectives for German Artillery Fire Schools published in 1895.

Decorations 

 In the Order of the Legion of honour : Knight on July 10, 1907 ; officer on January 1, 1917 ; Commander on December 29, 1922.
 Croix de Guerre on October 28, 1915.

Legacy 
A road in his hometown, Dambach-la-Ville, is named after him.

Citations

Notes

References

Bibliography 
 Defense Historical Service, dossier Gédéon Gesmar.
 Almanach du KKL de Strasbourg pour l'année 1993 , article de Philippe Landau.
 Geismar family tree, built by Hubert Metzger in 1992, based on notes by Marcel Léopold et Paul Metzger (sources : the and the archives of Grussenheim's Town Hall).
 
 Alphonse Halter, « Gédéon Geismar », in Nouveau dictionnaire de biographie alsacienne, vol. 12, 

Deaths in Paris
Commandeurs of the Légion d'honneur
École Polytechnique alumni
French military personnel of World War I
1931 deaths
1863 births
French Jews
French Jewish military personnel
French Zionists
Alsatian Jews
Recipients of the Croix de Guerre 1914–1918 (France)
Recipients of the Legion of Honour
French people of World War I
French activists
Brigadier generals